Village Alotna / Attna is a village in Yemen.

The village is one of isolation between the villages nearby Banydahman from the Directorate Hufash center - Directorate Hufash under center Directorate (Alsfiqin).

It is affiliated to village residents and of the top founders Al Alotna, Province Mahaweet - Republic of Yemen. Its founder is believed to be Ali bin Hussein Alotna.

References

Districts of Al Mahwit Governorate